William Henry Colbeck (1823 – 25 June 1901) was a 19th-century Member of Parliament in the Auckland Region of New Zealand.

Life in England
Colbeck was born in Batley, Yorkshire in 1823 and was baptised on 20 February. His parents were William Colbeck (1783–1849) and Elizabeth Richardson ( 1785 – 1856). He was involved in the woollen manufacture with his brothers Isaac and Simeon, trading as Cheapside Mill in Batley, and after selling that factory, trading as Colbeck Bros. in Alverthorpe.

Life in New Zealand

Colbeck emigrated to New Zealand in 1877 to join two of his sons in the Kaipara District. He enlarged the land holding and built a residence. Colbeck was a strong supporter of the construction of the North Auckland Line that would service the Northland Region. He laid out the township of Batley on the Kaipara Harbour as a settlement project, but nothing came of it.

In 1879 there were doubts about his election, and the Elections Validation Act, 1879  validated the election of Cobeck and two other MHRs, Honi Mohi Tawhai and Wiremu te Wheoro.

In about 1884, Colbeck moved to Auckland. He was well known as a businessman and president of the Bank of New Zealand, president of the Chamber of Commerce, and president of the Auckland Club.

Family and death
On 9 August 1849, Colbeck married Martha Cordingley, the daughter of John Cordingley, at Halifax. He is listed as a manufacturer at Batley in the marriage advertisement, and his wife as being from nearby Boothtown. His wife died on 4 June 1897 and was buried at St. Mark's Cemetery in Remuera. Captain Colbeck died at his home in Gladstone Road, Parnell, on 25 June 1901. He was survived by six sons and two daughters.

His son Frank Colbeck (1861–1941) was a life member of the Farmers' Union, and stood for the Country Party in three general elections. In , he came a distant fourth in the  electorate. In , he again contested the Tauranga electorate and was third (and last) again.

References

1823 births
1901 deaths
Members of the New Zealand House of Representatives
New Zealand MPs for North Island electorates
People from Batley
English emigrants to New Zealand
19th-century New Zealand politicians